2013 Confederation Cup may refer to two football competitions:

 2013 FIFA Confederations Cup between nations
 2013 CAF Confederation Cup between African clubs